Sombrillo is a census-designated place (CDP) in Santa Fe County, New Mexico, United States. It is part of the Santa Fe, New Mexico Metropolitan Statistical Area. The population was 493 at the 2000 census.

Geography
Sombrillo is located at  (35.981341, -106.038224).

Demographics

As of the census of 2000, there were 493 people, 179 households, and 138 families residing in the CDP. The population density was 508.0 people per square mile (196.2/km). There were 191 housing units at an average density of 196.8 per square mile (76.0/km). The racial makeup of the CDP was 76.67% White, 1.01% African American, 1.01% Native American, 0.61% Asian, 17.65% from other races, and 3.04% from two or more races. Hispanic or Latino of any race were 50.30% of the population.

There were 179 households, out of which 34.6% had children under the age of 18 living with them, 64.2% were married couples living together, 11.7% had a female householder with no husband present, and 22.9% were non-families. 21.2% of all households were made up of individuals, and 6.1% had someone living alone who was 65 years of age or older. The average household size was 2.75 and the average family size was 2.99.

In the CDP, the population was spread out, with 21.9% under the age of 18, 9.5% from 18 to 24, 26.0% from 25 to 44, 34.9% from 45 to 64, and 7.7% who were 65 years of age or older. The median age was 40 years. For every 100 females, there were 83.3 males. For every 100 females age 18 and over, there were 86.0 males.

The median income for a household in the CDP was $47,000, and the median income for a family was $46,125. Males had a median income of $34,821 versus $33,352 for females. The per capita income for the CDP was $16,809. None of the families and 1.4% of the population were living below the poverty line, including no under eighteens and none of those over 64.

Education
It is in Española Public Schools. Sombrillo has one elementary school, Tony E. Quintana "Sombrillo" Elementary. The comprehensive public high school is Española Valley High School.

See also

 List of census-designated places in New Mexico

References

External links

Census-designated places in Santa Fe County, New Mexico
Census-designated places in New Mexico